LOK Luna 17 (Ye-8 series) was an unmanned space mission of the Luna program, also called Lunik 17. It deployed the first robotic rover onto the surface of the Moon.

Launch 
Luna 17 was launched from an Earth parking orbit towards the Moon and entered lunar orbit on 15 November 1970. The spacecraft softly landed on the Moon in the Mare Imbrium (Sea of Rains). The spacecraft had dual ramps by which the payload, Lunokhod 1, descended to the lunar surface. Lunokhod 1 was a lunar vehicle formed of a tub-like compartment with a large convex lid on eight independently powered wheels. Lunokhod 1 was equipped with a cone-shaped antenna, a highly directional helical antenna, four teleray spectrometer, an x-ray telescope, cosmic-ray detectors, and a laser device were also included. The vehicle was powered by a solar cell array mounted on the underside of the lid. Lunokhod 1 was intended to operate through three lunar days but actually operated for eleven lunar days (eleven Earth months). The operations of Lunokhod officially ceased on 4 October 1971, the anniversary of Sputnik 1, after having traveled over  while taking pictures and performing numerous tests.

Luna 17 continued the spate of successes in Soviet lunar exploration begun by Luna 16 and Zond 8. Luna 17 carried Lunokhod 1, the first in a series of robot lunar roving vehicles whose conception had begun in the early 1960s, originally as part of the piloted lunar landing operations. This was the second attempt to land such a vehicle on the Moon after a failure in February 1969. The descent stage was equipped with two landing ramps for the rover, to disembark onto the Moon's surface. Each of its eight wheels could be controlled independently for two forward and two reverse speeds. The set of scientific instruments was powered by solar cells (installed on the inside of the hinged top lid of the rover) and chemical batteries. The Lunokhod 1 rover rolled over the ramps and onto the lunar surface at 06:28 UT. During its 322 Earth days of operation, the rover traveled  and returned more than 20,000 TV images and 206 high-resolution panoramas. In addition, Lunokhod 1 performed twenty-five soil analyses with its RIFMA X-ray fluorescence spectrometer and used its penetrometer at 500 different locations. Controllers finished the last communications session with Lunokhod 1 at 13:05 UT on 14 September 1971. Attempts to reestablish contact were finally discontinued on 4 October.

In March 2010, the Lunar Reconnaissance Orbiter photographed the landing site of Luna 17, showing the lander and tracks of the rover.  In April 2010, the Apache Point Observatory Lunar Laser-ranging Operation team announced that with the aid of these photos, they had found the long-lost Lunokhod 1 rover and had received returns from the laser retroreflector.

See also

 Lunokhod 1
 Lunokhod programme
 List of artificial objects on the Moon

References

External links
 Zarya - Luna 17 chronology

Luna programme
1970 in the Soviet Union
Soft landings on the Moon
Spacecraft launched in 1970
1970 on the Moon